Tony Blake may refer to:

 Tony Blake (English footballer) (1927–2014), Birmingham City and Gillingham player
 Tony Blake (Gaelic footballer) (born  1971/2), Donegal player